Home Sweet Home is the tenth studio album by classical crossover artist Katherine Jenkins and was released on 17 November 2014 in the  UK.

Track listing

Deluxe album version

Certifications

Personnel 
 Katherine Jenkins  – lead vocals

References

External links 
 
 

2014 albums
Katherine Jenkins albums